Kenton Live from the Las Vegas Tropicana is a live album by bandleader and pianist Stan Kenton featuring a concert recorded at the Blue Room of the Tropicana Hotel in 1958 and released on the Capitol label.

Reception

The Allmusic review by Scott Yanow noted "This is admittedly not one of the classic Stan Kenton recordings but is generally superior to his studio recordings of the period".

Track listing
All compositions by Stan Kenton except where noted.
 "Artistry in Rhythm" – 3:25  
 "Bernie's Tune" (Bernie Miller, Jerry Leiber, Mike Stoller) – 3:29  
 "Tuxedo Junction" (Erskine Hawkins, Bill Johnson, Julian Dash, Buddy Feyne) – 2:59
 "Street Scene" (Alfred Newman) – 2:59
 "Puck's Blues" (Gene Roland) – 3:04  
 "I Concentrate on You" (Cole Porter) – 3:12  
 "The End of a Love Affair" (Edward Redding) – 4:41  
 "You and I and George" – 0:55  
 "Sentimental Riff" (Roland) – 4:09  
 "Random Riff" (Roland) – 3:33  
 "Artistry in Rhythm" – 0:47

Personnel
Stan Kenton – piano, conductor
Joe Burnett, Bud Brisbois, Frank Huggins, Roger Middleton, Jack Sheldon – trumpet
Jim Amlotte, Kent Larsen, Archie Le Coque, – trombone 
Bob Olson, Bill Smiley – bass trombone 
Lennie Niehaus – alto saxophone
Richie Kamuca, Bill Trujillo – tenor saxophone
Billy Root, Sture Swenson – baritone saxophone
Red Kelly – bass, vocals 
Jerry McKenzie – drums 
Stan Kenton (track 1, 8 & 11), Lennie Niehaus (tracks 7 & 8), Johnny Richards (track 6), Gene Roland (tracks 2–5, 9 & 10) – arranger

References

1961 live albums
Capitol Records live albums
Albums conducted by Stan Kenton
Albums recorded at the Tropicana Las Vegas
Albums produced by Lee Gillette
Albums produced by Kent Larsen